Lvting Road, also known as Lüting Road, is an interchange station among Line 3, Line 5 and Line 16 of Hangzhou Metro in China. It is located in Yuhang District, Hangzhou.

Station structure

Platform layout
There are three island platforms at this station, one for Line 5 on B2 while two for Line 3 and Line 16 on B3. Same-direction cross-platform interchange is provided between Line 3 and Line 16.
Platform on B2

Platforms on B3

Gallery

References

Railway stations in Zhejiang
Railway stations in China opened in 2020
Hangzhou Metro stations